CTV 41 Bendigo was a free-to-air community television station based in Bendigo. The station was awarded a trial licence in July 1996 for broadcasting on UHF 41. On 2 April 1998, the Australian Broadcasting Authority, regulator of television and radio broadcasting in Australia, decided to not renew the trial licences of community broadcasters that were not yet on-air, but the intervention of the Community Broadcasting Association of Australia prompted the extension of such licences from 1 July 1998 to 30 June 1999.

The station eventually began broadcasting a test pattern on 19 June 1999 on UHF 41. On 26 June 1999, a 3-hour tape of programming information and music was broadcast on a loop. The station's licence was cancelled on 30 June 1999 due to its failure to broadcast regular programming.

References

External links
Official Website (archived site)
"CTV in Bendigo" (documentary broadcast on C31 Melbourne)

Television stations in Victoria (Australia)
Television channels and stations established in 1999
Television channels and stations disestablished in 1999
Defunct television channels in Australia
English-language television stations in Australia
1999 establishments in Australia
1999 disestablishments in Australia